The architecture of Baku is not characterized by any particular architectural style, having accumulated its buildings over a long period of time.

In itself, Baku contains a wide variety of styles, progressing through Masud Ibn Davud's 12th century Maiden Tower and the educational institutions and buildings of the Russian Imperial era.

Late Modern and Postmodern architecture began to appear in the early-2000s. With the economic development, old buildings such as Atlant House have been razed to make way for new ones. Buildings with all glass shell appear around the city, with the most prominent examples being the SOCAR Tower and Flame Towers.

Several monuments pay homage to people and events in the city. The Martyrs' Lane provides views of the surrounding area whilst commemorating the victims of Black January and Nagorno-Karabakh conflict.

Islamic architecture 

With Shi'a Islam being the dominant religion of Azerbaijan, there are may Islamic architecture featured buildings that resides in Baku. Religious places have more Islamic calligraphy drawn on the columns and other places on the structure. In December 2000, the Old City of Baku, including the Palace of the Shirvanshahs and Maiden Tower, became the first location in Azerbaijan to be classified as a World Heritage Site by UNESCO.

Islamic buildings continued to be constructed in Baku during the Imperial period. In particular, the Ajdarbey Mosque in then outskirts of the city was built in 1912–1913.

Imperial Russian and the Azerbaijan Democratic Republic era

Urban development and construction 

With the boom of the oil industry in Baku came an influx of both foreign western cash and ideas. Eclectic architecture fusing not only east and west, but several western styles as well became prevalent in the architecture found in the city outside the medieval walls. Local oil industrialists had the opportunity to travel, particularly to Europe, where they came back with ideas of the European architectural styles, and had both the desire and the capital to recreate them. Two industrialized districts would be created to the east of the original medieval city and Russian garrison, the denser and older Black City and the newer, sprawling White City.

The Black City was the first example of a planned industrial district in the Russian empire, it would be separated from the original residential and commercial zones by a two-kilometer buffer zone. A dense 80 sq meter block grid would be created, designated for a flexible factory-based use. Contemporaries would comment on how dirty this district was, with the black oil smoke that filled the air giving the area its name.

As Baku grew industrially, the White City would be developed to house the growing industry. It was characterized by its lack of a block structure, instead opting to have larger blocks (about 500x300 meters on average), irregular in size, which would accommodate to the shape taken by the factories rather than the other way around. The White City would grow to mainly house only select new refineries, which were cleaner than those used in the Black City, and would also be home to some of the workers housing developments created by the owners of the factories and refineries.

What had started as an oil boom in Baku soon turned to a construction one with the quick and massive influx of capital to the city. The city's population grew rapidly, at a rate faster than contemporary New York. The foreign population started to exceed that of the local Azeri's, and with it came western influence in construction. Due to the intensity and rapidness of development, the city was developed both vertically as well as horizontally, with most new construction boasting large foundations meant to have more levels added to it with the next influx of capital. Most of the construction was made using the local limestone quarried near the city, and the first few layers of development tended to be of vaulted masonry, meant to be structurally strong enough to develop additional stories on top later on. It was an architecture characteristic of that of an oil boomtown, one that was meant to be adapted and added to with the next boom. A side product of this rapid development, however, was un regulation in proper city planning, something complained about by contemporaries. There was a lack of proper street planning, lighting planning, transportation systems, and sanitary arrangements.

In a second cycle of construction, oil industrialists who had made their fortunes in the 1870s and 80s would develop the area between the medieval walled city and the Black City in the 1890s and early 1900s, creating the metropolitan Baku that would be nicknamed the "Paris of the Caspian." They would model the area after the great European cities of the time, with wide canopied boulevards, a seaside esplanade, monumental civic buildings, and all the new technologies in communication and transportation. The oil barons competed with each other to donate the most lavish and monumental civic buildings, but the initial construction was spearheaded by Haji Zeynalabdin Taghiyev (1823?-1924), one of the most philanthropic of the industrialists. The first Azerbaijani National Theater was founded in 1873, as well as another theater built in 1882. Parks and educational centers such as vocational schools were given great importance during this time, including Baku's first school for Muslim girls in 1910, designed by Josef Goslavsky, who was then the Chief Architect of Baku. Soon more of the wealthy industrialists followed and competed in a philanthropic battle of donating towards the development of the city, such as Musa Naghiyev and Shamsi Asadullaev. Many of the hallmarks of a thriving cosmopolitan city were constructed during this time. The Baku City Duma was built from 1900-1904, also designed by Goslavsky in an Italianate renaissance style on the northern edge of the medieval walled city.

Construction of buildings in Baku remained largely using the limestone available locally, with other materials easily brought down the Volga and through the city port. Unlike their European and Russian counterparts, however, they were not covered in stucco because of the local climate. Instead, the limestone was intricately carved, and thus used in creating ornamentation of the facade.

Oil baron mansions 

As well as competing between each other in philanthropic purposes, the oil industrialists of the 1880s, 90s, and early 1900s would compete with each other to build the most lavish mansions in the new residential quarters they created. They imported architects as well as style preferences from their travels to Europe, and sought to emulate the grand urban palaces they saw for themselves in Baku. These mansions would become emblematic of the distinct architectural style of pre-Soviet Baku, a fusion of east and western styles in the eclectic style which was popular in the period.

It started as an importing of purely Western styles, in some cases an almost exact copy, created from modified plans of a European palace. Such is the former residence of Murtuza Mukhtarov, built for his wife after she liked a French gothic palace they visited. Mukhtarov would obtain the plans, hired the polish architect I. K. Ploshko to modify the plans, and built in 1911-1912. After invasion by the Red Army it was converted to a "wedding palace," a purpose to which it still serves today.

The Taghiyev residence (1895-1902) is another example of the western style in the architecture, designed by the polish architect Goslavsky in the Italianate renaissance style he was known for. It is known for its heavily decorated interior, with a gilded main gallery on the second floor. It was richly decorated with a mixture of Art Nouveau ornamentation and furniture. It was converted to the National Museum of History of Azerbaijan under the soviets, and the limestone chiseled "T" for Taghiyev is still visible in the facade after a Soviet attempt to remove it. As the mixing of western styles with eastern elements continued, architects from places ranging between Germany, Russia, and Poland would design not only variations of eclectic mixes between Gothic and revival styles, but also eccentric mixes such as a three story mansion shaped like a dragon, a house in the shape of a house of cards, and another supposedly covered in gold leaf.

Gallery

Soviet period 

USSR Council of Ministers' resolution "On measures to further industrialization, improving quality and reducing the cost of construction" and "The removal of excess in the design and construction" in the mid-1950s has helped to initiate mass housing in Baku.

The architectural image of the country's capital was enriched by a number of interesting in conception projects and highly significant in terms of urban sites, such as the building of the historical Ismailiyya Palace, which nowadays is the office of the Presidium of National Academy of Sciences of Azerbaijan, the Lenin Palace (now the Heydar Aliyev Palace), as well as marine and railway stations.

Post-Soviet and present day 

Baku’s new business districts today has shifted around the Baku city center, with many high-tech buildings and postmodern architecture. Aside from buildings used for business and institutions, various new residential developments are currently underway, many of which consist of high-rise buildings with a glass exterior, surrounded by American-style residential communities.

List of architects in Baku 

The architects of Baku have influenced the city's architecture throughout its development during the 19th and 20th centuries.

History 

The names of numerous medieval architects of Baku are depicted on their buildings. One can mention the names of Masud ibn Davud, who designed Maiden Tower, his son Abdul-Majid Masud oglu, the author of the project of Sabayil Castle and Round Castle in Mardakan, Mahmud ibn Sa'd, who built Bibi-Heybat Mosque, Nardaran Fortress and Molla Ahmad Mosque in Baku's Old City, etc.

Due to the oil boom in the 19th century, Baku became a rapidly developing city and grew rapidly. The large-scale construction of the city was directly tied to the increase of the city's population. Eventually, this brought numerous Armenian, Azerbaijani, German (Adolf Eichler and Nicolaus von der Nonne), Polish (Józef Gosławski and Józef Płoszko) and Russian architects to the city, who ultimately influenced the city's architectural profile. Much of these architects were educated in Russia and, in particular, in St. Petersburg, Russia's capital city of the time. These included a number of high-profile designers, such as Freidun Aghalyan, Zivar bey Ahmadbeyov, Nikolai Bayev, Mammad Hasan Hajinski, and Hovhannes Katchaznouni. From 1860 till 1868, Gasim bey Hajibababeyov was considered the chief architect of Baku.

Architects during the Soviet period include Mikayil Huseynov, Sadig Dadashov, Lev Ilyin, Lev Rudnev etc. In Baku also worked architects Hasan Majidov, who designed the building of Museum center, Talaat Khanlarov, the author of Heydar Aliyev Sports and Exhibition Complex, Anvar Qasimzade, who designed the building of the Oil and Gas Research and Design Institute (1956) and Ulduz metro station.

Architects

Gallery

Current developments 

As a developing city largely influenced by economic oil boom, there are many construction projects that are currently being built that will change the city's skyline in the near future. Some of the construction project are SOCAR Tower, the Crescent Development project, Baku White City, Baku National Stadium, Full Moon Hotel, Baku Hilton Hotel, and the Four Seasons Hotel. A lot of the new development has come at the cost of old Soviet-era existing structures. The destruction of the Soviet heritage has created controversy, such as the recent destruction of the Soviet-era 26 Commissars Memorial in 2009 to make way for a new car park.

In 2011, Discovery channel's Extreme Engineering program featured these projects that are under construction in Baku.

Skyline

See also
 Architecture of Azerbaijan

References 

Baku

Baku